Pilani is a small city located, near the city of Jhunjhunu in the Jhunjhunu district of Rajasthan, India. Administratively, it forms a part of Jhunjhunu district. 
The place became popular since the establishment of BITS Pilani (Jhunjhunu). The city is also the home to some of the oldest schools of independent India.

Pilani also has an assembling centre for India's BrahMos missile. Moreover, Pilani is getting recognition at India level due to the rising number of startups which are incorporated by the students of BITS Pilani and Bkbiet Pilani. Pilani is also known in the Shekhawati region due to a large number of tourist destinations such as Panchwati, Saraswati Temple, Birla Museum, and Ram Mandir park.

Demographics
, Pilani has a population of 29,741 of which 51% are males and 49% females. The average literacy rate is 72%. Male literacy is 80% and female 63%. 12% of the population is under 6 years of age.

Geography

Climate 
Pilani has a semi-arid climate, typical of North Western India. Summers, which last from late March till the end of June are extremely hot and dry. They are followed by the monsoon months of July, August and early September, where temperatures drop slightly, and the humidity rises sharply. The months from late October to early March see warm days, and cool to chilly nights, with very dry conditions.

Education and research

Pilani is home to the Birla Institute of Technology and Science (BITS Pilani).

Apart from BITS, Pilani also has one of the major CSIR labs for advanced research in electronics, the Central Electronics Engineering Research Institute (CEERI), which is located next to the BITS campus. The GD Birla Memorial Polytechnic Institute named Birla Technical Training Institute (BTTI), established in 1988 in Pilani, is one of the top ranked diploma colleges in Rajasthan. Other colleges include the BK Birla Institute of Engineering & Technology (BKBIET), an engineering college formed in 2007, the Indermani Mandelia college for girls and the ShaadiLal Kataria Teacher Training college. In 2009, Shridhar University was established under the State Government Act as a private university. The university provides various higher education programs up to doctoral level. Schools include Birla Shishu Vihar, Birla High School, Birla Public School and Birla Balika Vidyapeeth.  Birla School Pilani is providing education from 1901.

Transportation

References

Cities and towns in Jhunjhunu district
Company towns in India